Grand may refer to:

People with the name
 Grand (surname)
 Grand L. Bush (born 1955), American actor
 Grand Mixer DXT, American turntablist
 Grand Puba (born 1966), American rapper

Places
 Grand, Oklahoma
 Grand, Vosges, village and commune in France with Gallo-Roman amphitheatre
 Grand Concourse (disambiguation), several places
 Grand County (disambiguation), several places
 Grand Geyser, Upper Geyser Basin of Yellowstone
 Grand Rounds National Scenic Byway, a parkway system in Minneapolis, Minnesota, United States
 Le Grand, California, census-designated place
 Grand Staircase, a place in the US.

Arts, entertainment, and media
 Grand (Erin McKeown album), 2003
 Grand (Kane Brown song), 2022
 Grand (Matt and Kim album), 2009
 Grand (magazine), a lifestyle magazine related to related to grandparents
 Grand (TV series), American sitcom, 1990
 Grand piano, musical instrument
 Grand Production, Serbian record label company
 The Grand Tour, a British automobile show

Other uses
 Grand Olympic Auditorium, a hall in Los Angeles
 Great Recycling and Northern Development Canal, a proposed water management scheme in Canada
 Grand Sierra Resort, a hotel and casino resort located in Reno, Nevada
 Slang for one thousand units of currency
 Grand Chancellor Hotel, international hotel brand
 Grand Staircase (White House), a staircase in the White House
 Grand Staircase of the Titanic, staircases in the RMS Titanic and RMS Olympic

See also

 Grand Canyon (disambiguation)
 Grand Hotel (disambiguation)
 Grand station (disambiguation)
 Grand Street (disambiguation)
 Grand Theatre (disambiguation)
 Grand Tour (disambiguation)
 Grande (disambiguation)
 Le Grand (disambiguation)
 The Grand (disambiguation)